Karmela Mudayatri Herradura Kartodirdjo or better known as Lala Karmela (born in Jakarta, Indonesia on 2 April 1985) is an Indonesian actress, singer and songwriter of mixed Filipino and Javanese descent.

Early life
Born Karmela Mudayatri Herradura Kartodirdjo on 2 April 1985, she is known simply as Lala. She is half-Filipino and half-Javanese. Her parents are Eko Kartodirdjo (Javanese father) and Rose Marie Herradura (Filipina mother). She became one of Warner Philippines' recording artists in 2007. Her acting career started in 2002 when she played in some "sinetrons", an Indonesian term for "teleserye". In 2004, she became the lead vocalist of Inersia and together they released an album entitled Bersama ("Together"). Despite her growing popularity in Indonesia, Lala recently relocated to the Philippines in the hopes of trying her luck in her second motherland.

Filmography
 Seleb Kota Jogja (SKJ)
 Ngenest

Discography

Studio albums
Stars (2007; Warner Music Philippines)
Kamu, Aku, Cinta (2011; Sony Music Indonesia)
Between Us (2013; Sinjitos Records)

Singles

English singles
"Stars"
"It's You"
"Waiting"
"What About You"
"Unsaid" (feat. Christian Bautista)
"Morning Star" (2012)
"Let's Go for a Ride" (2014)
"A Night to Remember" (2015)

Indonesian singles
"Buka Semangat Baru" (Open New Spirit)
"Hasrat Cinta" (Love Passion)
"Satu Jam Saja" (Just One Hour; 2010)
"Setulus Hati" (With a Sincere Heart; 2010)
"Kamu, Aku, Cinta" (You, Me, Love; 2011)
"Malam Sunyi di Cipaganti" (Quiet Night in Cipaganti; 2013)
"Berkilau" (Sparkling; 2013)
"Selamanya" (Forever; 2014)

Awards and nominations

References

1985 births
Living people
Filipino people of Indonesian descent
Filipino people of Javanese descent
21st-century Indonesian women singers
Indonesian people of Filipino descent
Javanese people
University of Indonesia alumni
21st-century Filipino women singers
People of Sangirese descent